The Automatic Certificate Management Environment (ACME) protocol is a communications protocol for automating interactions between certificate authorities and their users' servers, allowing the automated deployment of public key infrastructure at very low cost. It was designed by the Internet Security Research Group (ISRG) for their Let's Encrypt service.

Client implementations 

The ISRG provides free and open-source reference implementations for ACME: certbot is a Python-based implementation of server certificate management software using the ACME protocol, and boulder is a certificate authority implementation, written in Go.

Since 2015 a large variety of client options have appeared for all operating systems.

ACME service providers 
Providers which support no-cost or low-cost ACME based certificate services include Let's Encrypt, Buypass Go SSL, ZeroSSL, SSL.com and Google Trust Services. A number of other Certificate Authorities and software vendors provide ACME services as part of paid PKI solutions such as DigiCert, Entrust and Sectigo

API versions

API version 1 
API v1 specification was published on April 12, 2016. It supports issuing certificates for fully-qualified domain names, such as example.com or cluster.example.com, but not wildcards like *.example.com. Let's Encrypt turned off API v1 support on 1 June, 2021.

API version 2 
API v2 was released March 13, 2018 after being pushed back several times. ACME v2 is not backwards compatible with v1. Version 2 supports wildcard domains, such as *.example.com, allowing for many subdomains to have trusted TLS, e.g. https://cluster01.example.com, https://cluster02.example.com, https://example.com, on private networks under a single domain using a single shared "wildcard" certificate. A major new requirement in v2 is that requests for wildcard certificates require the modification of a Domain Name Service TXT record, verifying control over the domain.

Changes to ACME v2 protocol since v1 include:

 The authorization/issuance flow has changed.
 JWS request authorization has changed.
 The "resource" field of JWS request bodies is replaced by a new JWS header: "url".
 Directory endpoint/resource renaming.
 URI → URL renaming in challenge resources.
 Account creation and ToS agreement are combined into one step. Previously, these were two steps.
 A new challenge type was implemented, TLS-ALPN-01. Two earlier challenge types, TLS-SNI-01 and TLS-SNI-02, were removed because of security issues.

See also
 Simple Certificate Enrollment Protocol, a previous attempt at an automated certificate deployment protocol.

References

External links 
 
 List of ACME clients at Let's Encrypt
 List of commonly used ACME clients via acmeclients.com

Public key infrastructure
Internet security
Cryptographic protocols
Secure communication